Kasalanan ang Buhayin Ka is a 1990 Philippine action film directed by Francis "Jun" Posadas. The film stars Cesar Montano in his first leading role.

Cast
 Cesar Montano as Jimmy
 Joel Torre
 John Regala
 Rita Avila
 Vivian Foz
 Jojo Alejar
 Billy Joe Crawford
 Jovit Moya
 Vanessa Escaño

Production
Jestoni Alarcon was originally cast as the leading role, but turned it down in favor of another movie. Eventually, the role went to Cesar Montano.

References

External links

1990 films
Filipino-language films
Philippine action films
Seiko Films films
1990 action films
Films directed by Francis Posadas